Lawrence or Laurence Price may refer to:

Laurence Price, balladeer
Lawrence Price (politician), in United States Senate elections, 1916

See also
George Lawrence Price
Larry Price (disambiguation)